Stephen Ryan may refer to:

 Stephen V. Ryan (1825–1896), Canadian-born American prelate of the Roman Catholic Church
Stephen Ryan (footballer) (born 1970), Australian rules football player
Stephen Ryan (sport shooter), sport shooter from the Norfolk Islands
Stephen Ryan, host of Gardening Australia (2009-2011)

See also
Steve Ryan (disambiguation)